The Book of Knowledge was an encyclopedia aimed at juveniles first published in 1912, by the Grolier Society.

Originally largely a reprint of the British Children's Encyclopaedia with revisions related to the United States by Holland Thompson, over time the encyclopedia evolved into a new entity entirely. It was published under a policy of continuous revision, meaning that there were no separate editions, but annual printings that were edited and updated by the publisher. Thompson remained editor until his death in 1940. From 1941 to 1960 it was edited by Ellen V. McLaughlin and from 1960 to 1966 by John D. Tedford.
In 1966 it was replaced by the New Book of Knowledge.

The number of volumes fluctuated. It was originally a 24 volume set, but other print runs had 10, 12 or 20.; 1919 was a 20 volume set as shown in the image above, as was 1951. From 1949 Grolier also issued a Book of Knowledge Annual.

Encyclopaedia Britannica praised the index system that was introduced by the Book of Knowledge: "much of the success of the work as a reference tool resulted from its splendidly contrived index, which remains a model of its kind.". There was a separate index for poetry.

Sample pages of 1919 edition

References 

American encyclopedias
English-language encyclopedias
20th-century encyclopedias
Children's encyclopedias